Francis Hamilton may refer to:
Sir Francis Hamilton, 1st Baronet, of Killock, Irish landowner and politician
Francis Buchanan-Hamilton (1762–1829), later known as Francis Hamilton, Scottish physician and naturalist
Francis Alvin George Hamilton, Canadian politician usually known as Alvin Hamilton
Sir Francis Hamilton, 3rd Baronet (c. 1637–1714)

See also
Frank Hamilton (disambiguation)
Francis Hamilton Wedgwood of Wedgwood Pottery